Patrick van den Boogaard (born 10 March 1995) is a professional Dutch darts player who plays in Professional Darts Corporation events.

He reached a PDC Challenge Tour event final in 2019, where he lost to Stephen Burton. He qualified for his first PDC European Tour event that year too, when he qualified for the 2019 Austrian Darts Open, but lost in the first round to Stephen Bunting.

References

External links

1995 births
Living people
Dutch darts players
Professional Darts Corporation associate players